Damsel is a 2015 American drama film directed by Douglas Burgdorff and starring Aimée Laurence, Craig Anderson, Evan Todd, Eleanore Pienta, and Michael Burnet.

Cast
 Aimée Laurence as Cal
 Craig Anderson as John
 Evan Todd as Casey
 Eleanore Pienta as Tonya
 Michael Burnet as Harry
 Kale Browne as Gary
 David Joseph as Simon
 Tyler Gabrielle as Wanda
 Douglas Burgdorff as Darren
 Daniela Malave as Emily
 Oona Laurence as Ava
 Jeté Laurence as Little Sister

External links
https://m.imdb.com/title/tt4018516

American drama films
2015 drama films
2015 films
2010s English-language films
2010s American films